Kasim as a given name, a variant of Qasim. It may refer to:

People known only by the given name Kasim
Kasım Pasha,  Ottoman  general and governor
Kasım of Karaman,  the last bey of the Karaman Beylik, a Turkish principality in Anatolia
Şehzade Kasım, Ottoman prince (Şehzade)

People with the given name Kasim
 Kasim Edebali (born 1989), American football player
 Kasim Nuhu (born 1995), Ghanaian footballer
Kasim Reed, American lawyer and politician
Kasim Sulton, American musician

See also